"Shottle Bop" is a fantasy short story by American writer Theodore Sturgeon, first published in 1941 in the magazine Unknown. Avram Davidson has said that it is the source of all "odde shoppe" stories; and even if not that, of many.

The protagonist discovers a mysterious shop"The Shottle Bop", between Twentieth and Twenty-first Streets, on Tenth Avenue in New York Citywhich has bottles containing all manner of strange things. The proprietor dislikes his pompous attitude, paralyzes him by spraying him with the essential oil from the hair of a Gorgon's head, and only releases him after extracting a grudging apology. The proprietor then mixes up a strange potion, saying it will, when drunk, "cure" him and give him a "talent".

The protagonist returns home and, after initial reluctance, drinks the potion. He discovers that he can now see and talk with ghosts; although they cannot see him. When he goes back to look for the shop, it is not there. He sets himself up as a psychic investigator: a business at which he is highly successful, with the aid of unseen disembodied assistants.

He taunts some of his low-life former associates with his success. They round on him; but he persuades one of them to spend the night in a haunted house, for a bet. That night, the effects of the potion wear off.

References

1941 short stories
Fantasy short stories
Horror short stories
Short stories by Theodore Sturgeon
Works originally published in Unknown (magazine)